Westwood is a census-designated place (CDP) in Cambria County, Pennsylvania, United States. It was first listed as a CDP prior to the 2020 census.

The CDP is in southwestern Cambria County, in the eastern part of Lower Yoder Township. It is bordered to the north by the city of Johnstown, to the east by the borough of Brownstown, and to the south by the borough of Westmont.

References 

Census-designated places in Cambria County, Pennsylvania
Census-designated places in Pennsylvania